Adsit is an American surname. Notable people with the surname include:

 Gavin Kwan Adsit, Indonesian football player
 Nancy H. Adsit, American author
 O. H. Adsit, American mayor of Juneau, Alaska (1902–1904) 
 Scott Adsit (born 1965), American comedian

See also
 Adsit Log Cabin, historical American log cabin